Faith Pitman (born 4 May 1985) is a British judoka. She competed for England in the women's 63 kg event at the 2014 Commonwealth Games where she won a bronze medal. Faith Pitman has won a total of 11 Gold medals, 6 silver medals and 21 bronze medals in her career. She placed 7th in the 2007 World Championships in Rio de Janeiro at 57kgs. She also placed first in the women’s under 63 kg at the 2008 World Cup in Birmingham, England. Pitman won bronze medals for the women’s U20 and the women’s U23 European Championship and was the women’s under 63 kg British Champion in 2013.

References

External links
 
 
 

1985 births
Living people
English female judoka
Commonwealth Games bronze medallists for England
Judoka at the 2014 Commonwealth Games
Commonwealth Games medallists in judo
Medallists at the 2014 Commonwealth Games